The Sikorsky S-9 Kruglyj (Rounded One) was a Russian single engine prototype aircraft completed in the spring of 1913 by the Russian Baltic Railroad Car Works while Igor Sikorsky was the chief engineer of the aircraft manufacturing division.

Design and development
It was the first monocoque monoplane built in Russia and the cylindrical tapered fuselage was constructed of plywood 5 mm thick in the forward section and 3mm thick aft. Construction was completed in the spring of 1913.

Operational history
Upon completion the S-9 was found to be substantially heavier than anticipated and the engine only delivered 80% of its rated horsepower. Initial flight tests revealed very poor performance. The engine was replaced by a  Gnome Monosoupape and further flights showed only a nominal increase in speed. The machine was eventually scrapped.

Specifications

References

S-9
Single-engined tractor aircraft
Mid-wing aircraft
Aircraft first flown in 1913
Rotary-engined aircraft